"No Place to Hide" is a song written and recorded by American nu metal band Korn for their second studio album, Life Is Peachy. It was released as the album's first single in September 1996.

Chart performance

Charts

Live performance
The song has been seldom played since the promotional tours surrounding the release of Life Is Peachy. It is notable for being Korn's first televised performance, on a French music show on February 20, 1997. "No Place to Hide" made a return in 2011 during The Path of Totality Tour.

Music video
A video was not filmed; MTV compiled clips from Who Then Now? and the band's previous music videos in order for "No Place to Hide" to receive airplay on the station.

Awards
The song was nominated for a Grammy in 1998 for Best Metal Performance. It was Korn's second nomination in this category.

Track listing

UK Releases
CD5" UK Single Part 1 663842 2
"No Place to Hide" (Album Version) – 3:31
"Sean Olson" (Radio Edit) – 4:45
"Proud" – 3:14

CD5" UK Single Part 2 663845 5
"No Place To Hide" (Album Version) – 3:31
"Shoots and Ladders" (Dust Brothers Industrial mix) – 3:50
"Shoots and Ladders" (Dust Brothers Hip Hop mix) – 4:07

Note: The two remixes are wrongly named, the Hip-Hop Remix it is the Industrial Remix and vice versa!

UK 7" 663845 0
Side A:
"No Place To Hide" (Album Version) – 3:31

Side B:
"Proud" – 3:50

CD5" UK Promo CD XPCD 2088
"No Place to Hide" (Album Version) – 3:31

UK 10" Promo XPR 3086
Side A:
"No Place To Hide" (Album Version) – 3:31

Side B:
"Proud" – 3:50

German release
CD5" 663811 2
"No Place to Hide" (Album Version) – 3:31
"Sean Olson" (Radio Edit) – 4:45
"Lies" – 3:22

US Promo
CD5" ESK 8724
"No Place to Hide" – 3:31

See also

References

External links
  Lyrics

Korn songs
1996 singles
1996 songs
Epic Records singles
Songs written by Reginald Arvizu
Songs written by Jonathan Davis
Songs written by James Shaffer
Songs written by David Silveria
Songs written by Brian Welch